A Facebook Romance (2012) is a Jordanian romantic comedy film, storied and directed by music composer and film director Mohydeen Izzat Quandour.

Plot
A Jordanian girl who had run away from home refused to marry her cousin (a tradition in Jordan) goes to live with her married sister in New York. After nearly 5 years in America, she meets a Jordanian businessman on Facebook, played by Salar Zarza, and they become very close. She is impressed by the photos of his expensive cars and factories and his successful talk. She begins to dream that maybe this is her man and she should grab him before another girl gets the chance.

Cast
 Mohamed Karim as Samir
 Lamitta Frangieh as Lubna
 Mohamed Al Abadi as Abu Akram
 Mona Shehabi as Maha and Lubna's mother
 Ed Ward as Michael
 Sandra Kawar as Girl friend
 Mohammed Al Fassid as Omar
 Salar Zarza as Waleed
 Nabeel Kony as Father of Lubna

Reception
The film won three Angel Film Awards at the 2012 Monaco International Film Festival, for best actor Mohamed Karim, best supporting actor Ed Ward, and best ensemble cast.

References

External links

 Sindika Productions website

2012 films
2012 romantic comedy films
Jordanian comedy films